Xiaomi Mi MIX is an Android Smartphone manufactured by Xiaomi. It is designed by Philippe Starck, and awarded multiple top design awards for product design. It has been taken by multiple museum around the world as design collection, including Centre Pompidou in Paris and Design Museum. It is the world's 1st 3 border bezel-less phone category.
It was succeeded by the Xiaomi Mi MIX 2 in September 2017, followed by the Xiaomi Mi MIX 3 on 25 October 2018 and the latest Xiaomi MIX 4 on 10 August 2021.

Specifications
The Xiaomi Mi MIX's frame (including the back and side buttons) are made of ceramic. It features a  a 17:9 aspect ratio display. It has an  earpiece speaker made of a cantilever piezoelectric ceramic. The proximity sensor uses ultrasound radar instead of an infrared light.
The premium version of the model equipped with 6GB RAM and 256GB storage, and made by 18k Gold decoration on the back plates.
Mi MIX is still on official Xiaomi Update all the way till end of year 2019, with official MIUI 11 update with full-screen gesture navigation, which made Mi MIX still works elegantly even after 3.5 years of its initial debut.

References

External links
 

Android (operating system) devices
Phablets
Mobile phones introduced in 2016
Mobile phones with 4K video recording
Discontinued flagship smartphones
Xiaomi smartphones